is one of several commuter rail lines and services in the Osaka-Kobe-Kyoto Metropolitan Area, operated by West Japan Railway Company (JR West). The line, whose name literally means "east-west", runs underground through central Osaka and connects the Gakkentoshi Line at Kyobashi Station in Osaka and the JR Takarazuka Line and the JR Kobe Line at Amagasaki. All stations on this line are in the city of Osaka, except for the western terminus in Amagasaki, Hyōgo Prefecture.

Basic data

Operators, distances: 12.5 km / 7.8 mi.
West Japan Railway Company (Category-2, Services)
 Co., Ltd. (Category-3, Tracks)
Railway signalling:Automatic
CTC centers:Ōsaka Operation Control Center
CTC system:JR Takarazuka – JR Tozai – Gakkentoshisen traffic control system (JR west traffic control system)

Operation
All trains are local services and stop at every station on the line. Some trains terminate at Amagasaki, but most westbound trains continue on the Kobe Line to Nishi-Akashi and on the Takarazuka Line to Tsukaguchi and Takarazuka. All eastbound trains continue past Kyobashi on the Gakkentoshi Line.

History
The line was initially proposed in 1971 by Japanese National Railways (JNR) as a link between the Katamachi Line, which connected Osaka to its eastern suburbs, and Fukuchiyama Line, which connected the city to its northwestern suburbs. Osaka's municipal government had maintained tight controls over transportation within the city, and most intercity lines terminated outside the city center.

A permit to lay the track was given 10 years later, but the project stopped because of JNR's financial problems.

In 1988, after JNR privatized and split into Japan Railway companies, West Japan Railway Company formed a private-public entity called  with the prefectural governments of Osaka and Hyōgo, and the cities of Osaka and Amagasaki.

The line was completed and opened as JR Tozai Line in 1997.

Stations

Rolling stock 
 207 series (from 1991)
 321 series (from 2005)

Former
 223-6000 series (from March 2008, until March 2011)

References

External links
 JR Tozai Line

 
Railway lines opened in 1997
1067 mm gauge railways in Japan